Hans Ekstrand (27 December 1903 – 5 March 1969) was a German politician of the Social Democratic Party (SPD) and member of the German Bundestag.

Life 
In the Stormarn constituency, he was elected to the Bundestag in the 1949 federal elections. He became a full member of the committees for foreign trade issues, for food, agriculture and forestry and for social policy.

Literature

References

1903 births
1969 deaths
Members of the Bundestag for Schleswig-Holstein
Members of the Bundestag 1949–1953
Members of the Bundestag for the Social Democratic Party of Germany